Queen's Hill Estate is a public housing estate in Kwan Tei, Fanling, New Territories, Hong Kong. Formerly Queen's Hill Camp for British Forces Overseas Hong Kong, the site was originally planned for a private university, but later used for public housing due to declining numbers of secondary school graduates. It consists of seven residential blocks completed in 2021.

Shan Lai Court is a Home Ownership Scheme court in Kwan Tei, near Queen's Hill Estate. It consists of six residential blocks completed in 2021.

It will provide in stages a total of 8,865 PRH flats and 3,222 SSF flats for a population of around 34,500 people.

Houses

Queen's Hill Estate

Shan Lai Court

Politics
Queen's Hill Estate and Shan Lai Court are located in Queen's Hill constituency of the North District Council. It is currently represented by Law Ting-tak, who was elected in the 2019 elections.

See also

Public housing estates in Fanling

References

Kwan Tei
Public housing estates in Hong Kong
Residential buildings completed in 2021